Biuletyn Peryglacjalny was a scientific journal covering research on periglacial geomorphology. It was established in 1954 in Łódź by Polish geomorphologist Jan Dylik, who was its editor-in-chief until 1972. The journal ceased publication after 39 issues in 2000, after having played an important role in the development of periglacial geomorphology.

References

1954 establishments in Poland
Earth and atmospheric sciences journals
Geomorphology journals
Defunct journals
Publications established in 1954
Publications disestablished in 2000
Multilingual journals
Annual journals